O Boticário is the second biggest Brazilian cosmetic company. It has 4,070 stores in Brazil, Portugal, Mexico, Guyana, Bolivia, Peru, United States, Paraguay, Japan, France, Angola, Colombia and United Arab Emirates. O Boticário is the largest cosmetic franchise in the world.  The main competitors of the company are Natura, Avon Products and Jequiti.

History

O Boticário was created in 1977 as a small prescription drugstore in the city of Curitiba, capital of the state of Paraná, in southern Brazil. Today the company is the world’s largest perfumery and cosmetics franchising network.

O Boticário’s industrial and administrative complex has 34.4 thousand square meters of floor space in the city of São José dos Pinhais in the Curitiba Metropolitan Area. It employs 1,300 people and creates approximately 10 thousand jobs through its franchising network. O Boticário’s first manufacturing plant was inaugurated in 1982, with just 1 thousand square meters of floor space. Then it employed 27 people who worked to manufacture about 400 thousand items a year. O Boticário’s current production exceeds 59 million units.

Fundação O Boticário 

In 1990, the company created the Fundação O Boticário de Proteção à Natureza (O Boticário Nature Protection Foundation), a nonprofit organization that has already sponsored 800 conservationist projects including studies, scientific research, environmental education programs and direct fauna and flora protection actions all over Brazil. The Foundation also supports the "Natural Areas Protection Program", which aims at implementing its own network of private natural heritage reserves.

The first one is the Salto Morato Private Natural Heritage Reserve, which occupies a 2,340-hectare area, in Guaraqueçaba, on the north coast of the state of Paraná, in southern Brazil. This reservation protects a significant area of the Atlantic Rainforest, besides being provided with infrastructure for scientific research, environmental education, and outdoor recreation. In November 1999, the reservation supported by Fundação O Boticário de Proteção à Natureza was declared a Natural Heritage Site by UNESCO.

Products
O Boticário’s product lines consist of approximately 480 items, divided into the following categories: body care, facial care, sun care, makeup, deodorizing colognes, deodorants, soaps and shampoos.

Amazonian plants such as açaí, cupuaçu, carnaúba, guaraná, cashew, and passion flower; gums extracted from algae and vegetal extracts, such as arnica and urucum, are among the active ingredients present in the brand’s products.

Collaborations
O Boticário joined an exclusive partnership with Netflix in November 2022 with the launch of cosmetics products inspired by the series La Casa de Papel, Stranger Things and Sex Education.

Controversy
In May 2015, the company launched in Brazil a campaign titled "Toda Forma de Amor" (Every Kind of Love), made for Brazilian Valentine's Day (celebrated every June 12, the day before the Saint Anthony of Padua festivities), the campaign presented heterosexual and homosexual couples embracing and exchanging gifts of the brand. The video generated huge repercussion, mainly in social networks. The commercial, uploaded on YouTube, earned more than three million views and had more than 360,000 likes, against over 180,000 dislikes (until June 6, 2015).

Among conservative sectors of society, however, the campaign had negative repercussions. There have been calls for boycotting the brand by people like Silas Malafaia and homophobic statements in social networks. The National Council for Self-Regulatory Advertising (Conar) has also received inunerous complaints and initiated a process to verify possible abuses against the consumer in the advertising campaign of the company. On July 16, however, Conar decided to file a lawsuit against the video. The rapporteur of the process emphasized in his vote: "Don't count on publicity to omit the reality."

Boticário replied that "the proposal of the 'Couples' campaign, which was first broadcast on May 24, is to address, with respect and sensitivity, the current resonance about the most different forms of love regardless of age, race, gender or sexual orientation—represented by the pleasure of giving the person you love a gift on Valentine's Day." In an article published on the UOL Economia website, journalist James Cimino also pointed to inconsistencies in the brand's boycott movement as large multinationals—such as Apple, Microsoft, Google, HP, Intel, Facebook, The Coca-Cola Company, Colgate-Palmolive, Disney, Twitter, Visa, MasterCard, Starbucks, Nike, Xerox, Levi's, Gillette, Absolut, Amazon.com, Ray-Ban, Gap, American Airlines, Tiffany & Co., Budweiser and others—also support the LGBT movement, but were not threatened with boycott claims. A tumblr called "Aproveita e Boicota Também" (Boycott These As Well) was created to bring together all the brands that support the gay movement and should be avoided by homophobes.

References

External links

 Official O Boticário International Web site
 O Boticário Foudantion

Companies based in Paraná (state)
Manufacturing companies of Brazil
Chemical companies established in 1977
Cosmetics companies of Brazil
Brazilian brands
Cosmetics brands
Personal care brands
1977 establishments in Brazil